The Land of the Mountain and the Flood is a concert overture for orchestra, composed by Hamish MacCunn in 1887 and first performed at the Crystal Palace on 5 November of that year. The title is taken from Scott's The Lay of the Last Minstrel, canto vi, stanza 2:
           O Caledonia! stern and wild,
           Meet nurse for a poetic child!
           Land of the heath and shaggy wood,
           Land of the mountain and the flood,
           Land of my sires! what mortal hand
           Can e'er untie the filial band
           That knits me to thy rugged strand!
After the premiere The Musical Times commented, "The work – which is spirited and bold in conception and brilliantly scored – was finely played and enthusiastically received". After an 1890 performance at the Crystal Palace, Bernard Shaw wrote of the piece:

In 1968, the overture came to renewed attention when EMI included it on an LP "Music of the Four Countries" (ASD 2400), played by the Scottish National Orchestra conducted by Alexander Gibson. It gained wider familiarity by being used from 1973 to 1976 as the theme for the BBC television series Sutherland's Law.

Recordings

References

Sources

Concert overtures
Compositions by Hamish MacCunn
1887 compositions